Villanueva FC is a Honduran football club based in Villanueva, Cortés.

Villanueva currently plays in the  Honduran second division. They play their home games at the Estadio José Adrian Cruz.

Achievements
Liga de Ascenso
Runners-up (1): 2016–17 C

Managers
  Carlos Orlando Caballero (−2013)
  Juan "Montuca" Castro (Jun 2013 – Jul 2013)
  Dennis Allen (2013–)

References

Football clubs in Honduras